The North East Side (Denver), is a region/area located in both Denver County and Adams County. The neighborhoods located within Denver's north east side are Elyria-Swansea, Commerce City, and Derby. As of the 2007 Denver Piton Foundation and the United States Census Bureau, the region/area had a total population of 53,541 people.

Geography
The North East Side of Denver is bordered by North Denver, (Globeville), North Washington, Welby to the west, East Denver (Cole, Clayton, Northeast Park Hill) to the south, East Denver (Stapleton) to the east, and Adams County to the north.

Demographics
As of the 2007 Denver Piton Foundation and the United States Census Bureau, there were 53,541 people, 16,764 households, and 12,496 families within the north east side communities. There were a total of 18,633 housing units. The racial makeup of the community was 14.52% non-Hispanic White, 3.43% Black or African American, 0.96% Native American, 0.43% Asian, 41.31% from other races, and 3.81% from two or more races. 80.62% of the population wereHispanic or Latino.

The median income for a household in the community was $39,072. About 17.08% of the families and 19.46% of the population were below the poverty line, including 23.37% of those under age 18. The North East Side has a large population of Latinos/Hispanics (mostly Mexican), but there is also a large number of Central Americans and South Americans.

Education
The people that live in the Elyria-Swansea neighborhood in north east denver attend high school at either Manual High School or East High School.

The main elementary schools in the Elyria-Swansea neighborhood is Swansea Elementary School. The main middle schools attended are either Bruce Randolph Middle School or Smiley Middle School.

The main two high schools available for the kids of Commerce City and Derby are Lester Arnold High School, and Adams City High School.

Their main elementary schools are Dupont Elementary, Monaco Elementary, Hanson Elementary (PK-8), Kemp Elementary, Alsup Elementary, Central Elementary, and Rose Hill Elementary. The two main middle schools are Adams City Middle School and Kearney Middle School.

List of North East Side (Denver) Neighborhoods
Elyria-Swansea
Commerce City
Derby

See also
North West Denver

References

Denver metropolitan area
Regions of Colorado